Paños are pen or pencil drawings on fabric, a form of prison artwork made in the Southwest United States created primarily by pintos, or Chicanos who are or have been incarcerated.

The first paños, made with pieces of bedsheets and pillowcases, were made in the 1930s. They were originally used to communicate messages. Since then, they became used for primarily artistic purposes, and are often made with handkerchiefs. Prisoners sometimes use paños to get favors. Themes made with the artwork include Catholic faith symbols, Chicano political movement imagery, and prison imagery.

Prisoners often mail their artwork to their families. Families who receive the art put them in a box or binder as a keepsake instead of framing them.

In the 1990s Governor of Texas Ann Richards created enrichment programs for prisons. Michael Hoinski of the Texas Monthly stated that they "had helped spawn a golden age of paño-making in Texas." The programs were ended during the terms of governors George W. Bush and Rick Perry, and paños are now prohibited in the Texas Department of Criminal Justice.

Others, who are not Mexican American, nor Chicano, and who are not from the Southwest United states, nor use pen or pencil have created dramatically themed paños, such as Jesse Krimes's Apokaluptein:16389067 (2010–13).

Krimes, who is white, was born and raised in Pennsylvania. In 2009, Krimes was sentenced to 70 months in Federal prison. While there he created Apokaluptein:16389067. Apokaluptein:16389067 is a vast 39-panel surreal landscape mural on contraband prison sheets.

The work was created piece by piece using a hand printing technique. This technique consisted of meshing collected images together from New York Times clippings. Through hand drawn extensions in color pencil, a silk-screened effect was achieved by using hair gel as a transfer medium and a plastic spoon press to reassign the image.

The title of the work derives from the word apocalypse — and its greek roots meaning to uncover or reveal an event involving destruction on a catastrophic scale, while the numbers reference his federal bureau of prisons identification number. The work has been described as a contemporary version of Dante's Inferno. A place where heaven, earth, and hell are where politicians, celebrities, and offenders serve as archangels, angels, and demons.

Most of the 39 panels had to be smuggled out of prison. They represented a kind of graffiti, as the bed sheets were the property of the Federal Bureau of Prisons, and he did not have permission to deface nor alter them. Prison guards often assisted Krimes in smuggling out the panels. While in prison, Krimes never saw the completed version of this work. Apokaluptein:16389067 Sept. 2, - Dec. 14, 2014, debuted at the Zimmerli Art Museum on the campus of Rutgers University in New Jersey.

California prison artist Donald "C-Note" Hooker is African American. C-Note was born and raised in Los Angeles, California. In 2016, he created an untitled dramatic seascape on a handkerchief. This paño was created per the request of a Chicano prisoner who wanted to give the dramatic seascape to his girlfriend. C-Note used colored wax as his medium.

References

External links
 "Paño: Art from the Inside Out." Museum of International Folk Art
 "Reno Leplat-Torti´collection: PAÑOS - CHICANO PRISON ART." MOHS exhibit, Copenhagen.
 "Paños, Chicano Prison Art / Reno Leplat-Torti’s collection Press kit" (Archive). Reno Leplat-Torti Collection, Paris. September 2013.

Imprisonment and detention
Mexican-American culture in Texas